HMS Lily was a 16-gun  built for the Royal Navy during the 1830s.

Description
The ship's tonnage was 432  tons burthen. The Racer class was armed with a pair of 9-pounder (or 18-pounder) cannon and fourteen 32-pounder carronades. The ships had a crew of 120 officers and ratings.

Construction and career
Lily, the fifth ship of her name to serve in the Royal Navy, was ordered on 10 July 1832, laid down in December 1835 at Pembroke Dockyard, Wales, and launched on 29 September 1837. She was completed on 12 March 1838 at Plymouth Dockyard and commissioned on 15 December 1837.

Notes

References

External links
 

Racer-class brig-sloop
1837 ships
Ships built in Pembroke Dock